Moulins or Moulin (French for mill) may refer to:

Places

France
 Diocese of Moulins
 Moulins, Allier, in the Allier department (the largest Moulins)
 Moulins, Aisne, in the Aisne department
 Moulins, Ille-et-Vilaine, in the Ille-et-Vilaine department
 Moulins-Engilbert, in the Nièvre department
 Moulins-en-Tonnerrois, in the Yonne department
 Moulins-la-Marche, in the Orne department
 Moulins-le-Carbonnel, in the Sarthe department
 Moulins-lès-Metz, in the Moselle department
 Moulins-Saint-Hubert, in the Meuse department
 Moulins-sur-Céphons, in the Indre department
 Moulins-sur-Orne, in the Orne department
 Moulins-sur-Ouanne, in the Yonne department
 Moulins-sur-Yèvre, in the Cher department
 Moulin-Mage, in the Tarn department
 Moulin-Neuf, Ariège, in the Ariège department
 Moulin-Neuf, Dordogne, in the Dordogne department
 Moulin-sous-Touvent, in the Oise department

Scotland
Moulin, Scotland, a small settlement just outside Pitlochry, in Perth and Kinross council area

Fictional locations
Marlinspike Hall, the original French name of Captain Haddock's chateau in The Adventures of Tintin

Other uses
 Moulin (geomorphology)
Moulin (surname)
Moulin Rouge, a famous cabaret in Paris